is a passenger railway station located in the city of  Yokosuka, Kanagawa Prefecture, Japan, operated by the private railway company Keikyū.

Lines
Maborikaigan Station is served by the Keikyū Main Line and is located 54.2 kilometers from the northern terminus of the line at Shinagawa  Station in Tokyo.

Station layout
The station consists of two elevated opposed side platforms with the station building underneath.

Platforms

History
Maborikaigan Station opened on April 1, 1930.

Keikyū introduced station numbering to its stations on 21 October 2010; Maborikaigan Station was assigned station number KK63.

Passenger statistics
In fiscal 2019, the station was used by an average of 9,045 passengers daily. 

The passenger figures for previous years are as shown below.

Surrounding area
 National Defense Academy of Japan
Yokosuka City Maboricho Elementary School
Yokosuka City Maboricho Junior High School

See also
 List of railway stations in Japan

References

External links

 

Railway stations in Kanagawa Prefecture
Railway stations in Japan opened in 1930
Keikyū Main Line
Railway stations in Yokosuka, Kanagawa